Elvis is a 2022 biographical drama film directed by Baz Luhrmann from a screenplay he co-wrote with Sam Bromell, Craig Pearce, and Jeremy Doner. It chronicles the life of the American rock and roll singer and actor Elvis Presley under the management of Colonel Tom Parker. The film stars Austin Butler and Tom Hanks as Presley and Parker, respectively, with Olivia DeJonge, Helen Thomson, Richard Roxburgh, David Wenham, Kodi Smit-McPhee, and Luke Bracey in supporting roles.

A biographical film about Elvis was first announced in 
2014, with Luhrmann set to direct, but the project languished in development hell until early-2019, when Hanks joined the film. Butler was cast in the title role that July, beating out several other actors including Miles Teller and Harry Styles. Filming began in Australia in January 2020 but was put on hiatus in March after Hanks tested positive for COVID-19 at the onset of the pandemic. Production resumed in September, wrapping in March 2021.

Elvis premiered at the Cannes Film Festival on May 25, 2022, and was released in Australia on June 23 and in the United States on June 24, by Warner Bros. Pictures. The film was a commercial success, grossing $287 million worldwide on an $85 million budget. It received generally positive reviews from critics; Butler's performance garnered widespread acclaim, Luhrmann's direction, the cinematography, costume design, production design, and musical sequences also received praise, though the script, Hank's performance and the runtime drew polarized responses. The American Film Institute named Elvis one of the ten best films of 2022, and it was nominated for eight awards at the 95th Academy Awards, including Best Picture and Best Actor for Butler, and received numerous other accolades. In 2023, at the Oscars, Baz Luhrmann announced that there was a stage adaptation of the movie in the works.

Plot 

On January 20, 1997, Elvis Presley's former manager, Colonel Tom Parker, is on his deathbed, having suffered a stroke. Nursing a gambling addiction that has left him destitute, he recounts how he first met Presley.

Raised mostly by his doting mother Gladys, Presley spends his childhood in the poorest parts of Tupelo, Mississippi, finding solace in music and the comic book adventures of Captain Marvel Jr. After he moves with his parents to Memphis, his peers ridicule him due to his fascination with the African-American music of Beale Street. Parker, at the time a carnival "huckster," manages country singer Hank Snow. He realizes Presley's crossover potential when he hears "That's All Right" and assumes at first that the artist is black. That night, after witnessing Presley's intense sex appeal at a "Louisiana Hayride" performance, Parker meets with and persuades Presley to accompany him on a tour. On the tour, Parker convinces Presley to let him take control of his career. This begins Presley's meteoric ascent: he moves from Sun Records to RCA Records, his father is appointed as business manager of Elvis Presley Enterprises, and the family is lifted out of poverty. 

The regional public is divided in their view of the singer. Feeling that Presley's music will corrupt white children and stoke racial hostility, the segregationist Southern Democrat Mississippi Senator James Eastland calls Parker to an informal hearing and questions him about his mysterious past. When Presley performs sexually charged dance moves at a concert despite being warned by the authorities to refrain from doing so, he faces legal trouble. Parker persuades the government to draft Presley into the US Army instead of penalizing him. Presley returns devastated from basic training upon his mother's alcoholism-induced death. During his military service in West Germany, he meets Priscilla Beaulieu, the teenage daughter of a United States Air Force pilot. After his discharge, he embarks on a film career and later marries Priscilla.

As the popular culture of the 1960s passes Presley by, the assassinations of Martin Luther King Jr. and Robert F. Kennedy in 1968 devastate him. Although he wants to become more politically outspoken in his music, Parker has booked a Christmas television special where he will only perform frivolous feel-good songs. Presley works with Steve Binder to re-imagine the special, and his performance choices, including the closing song, "If I Can Dream," incorporate not only a review of his past songs but also political commentary. Infuriated corporate sponsors threaten litigation, while Parker believes Presley has been "brainwashed by hippies." Nevertheless, the show is highly successful.

After the special, Presley headlines at the largest showroom in Las Vegas, the International Hotel, and resumes concert tours. Parker's control of Presley's life tightens as he refuses Presley's request for a world tour. Motivated by gambling debts, Parker manipulates Presley into signing a contract for a five-year Las Vegas casino residency. Presley's problematic behavior and prescription drug addiction overtake him, and a despondent Priscilla divorces him on his 38th birthday, taking their daughter Lisa Marie with her. After discovering that Parker cannot leave the country because he is a stateless illegal immigrant, Presley attempts to fire him. In response, Parker tells Presley's father that the family owes him an $8.5 million debt accumulated over the years. Parker convinces Presley of their symbiotic relationship, and though they rarely see each other afterward, Parker continues as his manager.

Presley continues a rigorous schedule of shows that leaves him increasingly exhausted. In 1974, he expresses to Priscilla that his greatest fear is being forgotten after death, as he believes he hasn't achieved anything worthwhile. Parker finishes his recollection, after claiming that Elvis's love for the public eventually killed him, remembering that at one of his final shows on June 21, 1977, in Rapid City, South Dakota, Presley, now obese and pale, sang "Unchained Melody" and ended the performance to thunderous applause. In the present, Parker dies impoverished and alone.

An epilogue reveals that a series of lawsuits after Presley's death exposed Parker's financial abuse of Presley, with Parker settling out of court and cutting his ties to the Presley estate after failing to claim immunity as a stateless person. Presley remains the best-selling solo artist in history, and his legacy continues to the present day.

Cast 

 Austin Butler as Elvis Presley
 Chaydon Jay as young Elvis Presley
 Tom Hanks as Colonel Tom Parker
 Olivia DeJonge as Priscilla Presley
 Helen Thomson as Gladys Presley
 Richard Roxburgh as Vernon Presley
 Kelvin Harrison Jr. as B.B. King
 David Wenham as Hank Snow
 Kodi Smit-McPhee as Jimmie Rodgers Snow
 Luke Bracey as Jerry Schilling
 Dacre Montgomery as Steve Binder
 Leon Ford as Tom Diskin
 Gary Clark Jr. as Arthur "Big Boy" Crudup
 Yola as Sister Rosetta Tharpe
 Natasha Bassett as Dixie Locke
 Xavier Samuel as Scotty Moore
 Natalie Bassingthwaighte as Dee Stanley
 Adam Dunn as Bill Black
 Alton Mason as Little Richard
 Shonka Dukureh as Big Mama Thornton / Pentecostal singer
 Sharon Brooks as Sylvia Shemwell of the Sweet Inspirations
 Nicholas Bell as James Eastland
 Liz Blackett as Minnie Mae Presley (Elvis' grandmother) 
 Josh McConville as Sam Phillips 
 Kate Mulvany as Marion Keisker
 Cle Morgan as Mahalia Jackson

Production

Development and casting 

The project was first announced in April 2014, when Baz Luhrmann entered negotiations to direct the film, with Kelly Marcel writing the script.

No further development was announced until March 2019, when Tom Hanks was cast in the role of Colonel Tom Parker. Luhrmann was set as director, and also replaced Marcel as screenwriter with Sam Bromell and Craig Pearce. In July, the frontrunners for the role of Presley were Ansel Elgort, Miles Teller, Austin Butler, Aaron Taylor-Johnson and Harry Styles; later that month Butler won the role, after impressing Luhrmann with an audition tape of himself singing "Unchained Melody". Luhrmann revealed in an interview with Entertainment Weekly that he got a call from actor-director Denzel Washington recommending Butler. In October, Olivia DeJonge was cast to play Priscilla Presley. Maggie Gyllenhaal and Rufus Sewell were cast as Gladys and Vernon Presley in February 2020 (though they were replaced in the film by Helen Thomson and Richard Roxburgh, respectively), with Yola cast as Sister Rosetta Tharpe.

Filming 
Principal photography began on January 28, 2020, in Australia. On March 12, 2020, production was halted when Hanks and his wife Rita Wilson tested positive for COVID-19 during the pandemic. Filming resumed on September 23. In September 2020, Luke Bracey, Richard Roxburgh, Helen Thomson, Dacre Montgomery, Natasha Bassett, Xavier Samuel, Leon Ford, Kate Mulvany, Gareth Davies, Charles Grounds, Josh McConville, and Adam Dunn joined the cast of the film. Roxburgh and Thomson replaced Sewell and Gyllenhaal, respectively, who had to drop out due to scheduling conflicts caused by the shooting delay. Kelvin Harrison Jr. was announced to be portraying B.B. King in December. In January 2021, it was reported that Alton Mason would be portraying Little Richard in the film. On May 25, 2022, Butler revealed to GQ that after filming wrapped in March 2021, he was hospitalized and bedridden for a week after being diagnosed with a virus that simulated appendicitis.

Music 

On April 25, 2022, it was announced that Doja Cat would contribute an original song for the film, "Vegas", which incorporates elements from Big Mama Thornton's "Hound Dog". It was released as a single on May 6, 2022, ahead of the film's companion soundtrack album, scheduled for release that summer by RCA Records. The album will also feature variations on Presley material by big name artists in a variety of genres and styles. Italian band Måneskin and Kacey Musgraves are also part of the soundtrack with their respective cover versions of "If I Can Dream" and "Can't Help Falling in Love". On May 23, 2022, rapper Eminem announced on his Instagram that he and CeeLo Green will collaborate on a new track titled "The King and I" which will be produced by Dr. Dre and will appear on the film's soundtrack. The full roster of artists for the soundtrack album was announced the same day with Stevie Nicks, Jack White, Diplo, Swae Lee and many more joining the lineup, along with the film's cast. Austin Butler's renditions of Presley's songs, as well as actual recordings by Presley himself, are also featured. "The King and I" was released on June 16, 2022, earlier than its originally intended release date. The complete soundtrack was released on June 24, 2022, entering the Billboard soundtrack chart at No. 1 on July 9, 2022.

On June 12, 2022, Luhrmann revealed that when Elvis sings in the film, it is Butler's vocals that are used when he is young, while the real Elvis's vocals are used when he is older. To prove it, he released on social media an early 2019 pre-production test shoot of Butler as young Elvis performing "That's All Right" live on set, which went viral and received an overwhelmingly positive response from viewers. Butler's vocals were blended with Elvis's when he is older.

Marketing 
The first three-minute trailer for the film premiered during NBC's live coverage of the 2022 Winter Olympics on February 17, 2022, and was uploaded online the same day. Nick Relly of Rolling Stone stated "The trailer opens with a foreboding voiceover from Hanks’s Parker, in which he acknowledges that he is considered the "villain of this here story" — owing to the widespread belief that Parker's interest in Elvis was mainly financially motivated. From there, we’re given a look at some of Elvis’ most electrifying early performances, with Butler bearing an uncanny resemblance to the King himself." Sasha Urban of Variety and Rania Aniftos of Billboard, praised Butler's performance as he "uncannily resembled Presley". The second trailer premiered online on May 23, 2022, two days before the film's world premiere at the 2022 Cannes Film Festival. James White of Empire had stated "With typical Luhrmann swagger and style, this could be a good fit of filmmaker and subject". Screen Rant-based Adam Bentz had stated "The trailer highlights how the biopic spans a period of over twenty years and chronicles both the singer's opulent rise to stardom and eventual fall from grace."

NME magazine dedicated a standalone free-print issue of 36 pages, covering Presley's life, interviews with Butler, Luhrmann and other cast members. A special Elvis-inspired shoot with artists Wallice and Master Peace, musical guide to 10 tracks from Presley and the city of Memphis and the magazine's interview with Presley in 1960 (from the archives). The magazine issues were made available digitally and through physical prints in stores on June 16, 2022. An ABC special, Exclusively Elvis: A Special Edition of 20/20, featuring a look at Presley's real-life and the making of the film, aired on June 21, 2022, to promote the film. AMC Theatres, in collaboration with Feverup, had announced a pre-sale special, where viewers can purchase ticket prices costing $10.99. The final trailer was released online on June 22, 2022.

Release 
Elvis was theatrically released in Australia on June 23, 2022, and in the United States on June 24, by Warner Bros. Pictures. It was previously scheduled to be released on October 1, 2021, before being delayed to November 5, 2021, due to the COVID-19 pandemic, and later to June 3, 2022. The film was not listed as part of the December 2020 announcement by Warner Bros. Pictures to debut its entire 2021 slate concurrently in movie theatres and on HBO Max, before the film was officially pushed to 2022.

The film became eligible to be made available on HBO Max and/or premium video on demand (PVOD) on August 8, 2022, 45 days after its theatrical release, under a plan announced by WarnerMedia in 2021. However, IndieWire reported shortly before that date that the merged Warner Bros. Discovery had decided to instead release Elvis solely to PVOD on August 9 and to Blu-ray/DVD on September 13 with HBO Max availability likely to follow in the fall. The film became available for streaming exclusively on HBO Max on September 2, followed by the HBO network premiere on September 3.

The film had its world premiere at the 2022 Cannes Film Festival on May 25, 2022, where it received a twelve-minute standing ovation from the audience, the longest for an Australian film at the festival and tying with Hirokazu Kore-eda's Broker for the longest overall. It also opened the Guadalajara International Film Festival in Mexico on June 10 and at the Sydney Film Festival in Australia on June 15.

Luhrmann said in June 2022 that a four-hour cut exists, containing scenes of Presley with his first girlfriend, Dixie, and his meeting with President Richard Nixon in 1970..Following the film's reception of its eight Oscar nominations, Warner Bros. announced its return to theaters for a limited engagement starting on January 27, 2023.

Reception

Box office 
Elvis has thus far grossed $151 million in the United States and Canada, and $137.2 million in other territories, for a worldwide total of $288.2 million.

In the United States and Canada, Elvis was released alongside The Black Phone, and was projected to gross $25–30 million from 3,906 theaters in its opening weekend. It made $12.7 million on its first day, including $3.5 million from Thursday night previews. It went on to debut to $31.2 million, beating out holdover Top Gun: Maverick for first place atop the box office. According to PostTrak, 31% of the opening weekend audiences was over the age of 55, with 48% being over 45, while women over 25 (the most hesitant to return to theaters amid the pandemic) made up 45%. The main reasons given for seeing the film were the subject matter (49%) and Hanks (25%). In its second weekend the film made $18.5 million (a drop of 40.9%), and $22.7 million over the four-day Independence Day weekend, finishing third. In its third weekend the film made $11.2 million, finishing in fourth. 

Outside the US and Canada, the film made $20 million from 50 markets in its first international weekend. In its second weekend, the film passed the $100 million worldwide threshold after adding $15.7 million (a drop of 28%) to its total. In its third weekend, it performed well against newcomer Thor: Love and Thunder internationally, grossing $8.7 million (a drop of 44%). It crossed the $200 million worldwide mark in its fifth weekend. As of August 24, 2022, the film's largest markets include the UK ($29.47 million), Australia ($22.5 million), France ($8.3 million), Mexico ($7.4 million), Japan ($5.2 million), and Germany ($6.01 million).

Critical response 

  Audiences polled by CinemaScore gave the film an average grade of "A–" on an A+ to F scale, while PostTrak gave the film an 88% overall positive score, with 72% saying they would definitely recommend it.

Butler's portrayal of Presley was widely acclaimed. Justin Chang of the Los Angeles Times described Butler as "a decent physical match for Elvis and a better one vocally." David Rooney wrote for The Hollywood Reporter that Butler "captures the tragic paradox of a phenomenal success story who clings tenaciously to the American Dream even as it keeps crumbling in his hands." Clarisse Loughrey of The Independent wrote that he "makes a compelling argument for the power of Elvis, at a time when the musician's arguably lost a little of his cultural cachet."

On the film itself, Robbie Collin of The Telegraph gave it four out of five stars, calling it "a bright and splashy jukebox epic," but that "it veers in and out of fashion on a scene-by-scene basis: it's the most impeccably styled and blaringly gaudy thing you'll see all year, and all the more fun for it." Kevin Maher of The Times called it Luhrmann's "best film since Romeo + Juliet ... The power in the musical numbers is drawn from Butler's turn but also from Luhrmann, who edits with the kind of frenetic rhythms that are almost impossible to resist (feet will tap) ... They are the spine-tingling highlights that make the entire project a must-see movie." Jim Vejvoda of IGN called it "a dizzying and at times even overwhelming chronicle of the rock icon." Owen Gleiberman of Variety called it "A fizzy, delirious, impishly energized, compulsively watchable 2-hour-and-39-minute fever dream – a spangly pinwheel of a movie that converts the Elvis saga we all carry around in our heads into a lavishly staged biopic-as-pop-opera." Joshua Rothkopf wrote for Entertainment Weekly that it "delivers the icon like never before" and that Luhrmann recaptured "his Moulin Rouge! mojo with a hip-swiveling profile loaded with risk and reward." He went on to praise Butler's performance, saying that he "...stares down the lens and melts it."

Manohla Dargis of The New York Times, while praising the visuals and Butler's performance, felt mixed about the film being told from Colonel Tom Parker's perspective, saying "I would have loved to have listened in on Luhrmann and Hanks's conversations about their ideas for the character; if nothing else, it might have explained what in the world they were after here. I honestly haven't a clue, although the image of Sydney Greenstreet looming menacingly in The Maltese Falcon repeatedly came to mind, with a dash of Hogan's Heroes." 
In a review for IndieWire, David Ehrlich wrote that it "finds so little reason for Presley's life to be the stuff of a Baz Luhrmann movie that the equation ultimately inverts itself, leaving us with an Elvis Presley movie about Baz Luhrmann. They both deserve better." He also criticized Hanks's portrayal of Parker, calling it "a 'true true' performance defined by a fat suit, a fake nose, and an accent that I can only describe as the 'Kentucky Fried Goldmember'." On a historical note, journalist Alanna Nash, who had written an acclaimed biography of Parker in 2010, called the film a "Baz Luhrmann fever dream" that kept the liberties of history fair except to Parker, citing that Luhrmann's approach of presenting it through a present-day lens meant that the complicated character researched by Nash of Parker is simplified.

Response of the Presley family

Prior to its world premiere at the Cannes Film Festival, Lisa Marie Presley, Elvis's daughter, praised the film in an Instagram post after seeing it twice, and she went on to give her thoughts on Butler's performance as her late father, stating that he "channeled and embodied my father's heart and soul beautifully. In my humble opinion, his performance is unprecedented and FINALLY done accurately and respectfully", while touting Butler as a frontrunner for the Academy Award for Best Actor. On Luhrmann's direction, she wrote that: She added that watching the film reminded her of her own son, Benjamin, who died by suicide in 2020, saying he would have loved it as well.

On January 10, 2023, Lisa Marie appeared at the 80th Golden Globe Awards in support of Butler's win for Best Actor – Motion Picture Drama; it was her last public appearance before her death two days later.

Elvis's ex-wife, Priscilla, gave her thoughts on the film, saying in full:  In an interview with Today on August 16, 2022, Priscilla defended parts of the film's portrayal of Elvis and Parker's tense relationship, stating, "I lived the arguments that they had, I lived Elvis trying to explain he didn't want to do the movies with all the girls and the beaches and everything, that he really wanted to do serious things. So living that, with him, and watching the movie, it brought back a lot of memories."

On May 21, 2022, Presley's granddaughter, actress and filmmaker Riley Keough, shared her response after viewing the film at Cannes, saying in full:

Accolades 

At the 95th Academy Awards, Elvis received nominations for Best Picture, Best Actor, Best Sound, Best Production Design, Best Cinematography, Best Makeup and Hairstyling, Best Costume Design, and Best Film Editing. The film's other nominations include nine British Academy Film Awards (winning four), seven Critics' Choice Movie Awards (winning one), and three Golden Globe Awards (winning one). It was named one of the ten best films of 2022 by the American Film Institute.

Notes

References

External links
 
 
 
 Official screenplay
 Elvis at History vs. Hollywood

2022 films
2020s English-language films
2020s American films
2022 biographical drama films
American biographical drama films
American rock music films
Biographical films about musicians
Biographical films about singers
Cultural depictions of Elvis Presley
Cultural depictions of rock musicians
Films about Elvis Presley
Films about racism in the United States
Films directed by Baz Luhrmann
Films featuring a Best Drama Actor Golden Globe winning performance
Films postponed due to the COVID-19 pandemic
Film productions suspended due to the COVID-19 pandemic
Films set in the 1950s
Films set in the 1960s
Films set in the 1970s
Films set in the 1990s
Films set in 1947
Films set in 1954
Films set in 1956
Films set in 1968
Films set in 1973
Films set in 1997
Films set in the Las Vegas Valley
Films set in Memphis, Tennessee
Films shot in Australia
Films shot at Village Roadshow Studios
Midlife crisis films
Priscilla Presley
Rockabilly
Warner Bros. films